Hutchins is an unincorporated community in Oglethorpe County, in the U.S. state of Georgia.

History
Variant names were "Huching", "Huchings", and "Hutchings". A post office called Huching was established in 1892, and remained in operation until 1937. The community was named after one Captain Hutchins (or Huchins), a railroad conductor.

References

Unincorporated communities in Oglethorpe County, Georgia
Unincorporated communities in Georgia (U.S. state)